Metamorfosi railway station is a station on the Piraeus–Platy railway line, located on Kifisias Avenue in Marousi, a northern suburb of Athens, Greece, located in the median strip of the Attiki Odos motorway. The station opened on 8 August 2010. The station consists of an island platform and a train storage line.

History
The station opened on 8 August  2010, during the Greek debt crisis. With the crisis unfolding OSE's Management was forced to reduce services across the network. Timetables were cutback, and routes closed as the government-run entity attempted to reduce overheads. Services from Athens Airport & Athens were cut back, with some ticket offices closing, reducing the reliability of services and passenger numbers. In 2017 OSE's passenger transport sector was privatised as TrainOSE, currently, a wholly owned subsidiary of Ferrovie dello Stato Italiane infrastructure, including stations, remained under the control of OSE.

Facilities
The station has a ticket office and cafe 'Out of the Box coffee shop'. At platform level, the station is equipped with Dot-matrix display departure and arrival screens on the platforms for passenger information, seating, and information boards, with access to the platforms via life or escalator. Outside the station is a bus stop where the local 604, 724 & B9 call. There is no onsite Parking available at the station.

Services

Since 15 May 2022, the following weekday services call at this station:

Station layout

See also
Hellenic Railways Organization
Hellenic Train
Proastiakos
P.A.Th.E./P.

References

External links
 Metamorfosi railway station - National Railway Network Greek Travel Pages

Marousi
West Athens (regional unit)
Attica
Railway
Buildings and structures in North Athens
Railway stations in Attica
Transport in Athens
Transport in Attica
Transport in North Athens
Railway stations opened in 2004
Railway stations in highway medians